William Hoy is an American film editor with over two dozen feature-film editing credits since 1988. Hoy and Stan Salfas won Satellite Awards for Best Editing for the films Dawn of the Planet of the Apes (2014) and War for the Planet of the Apes (2017). Hoy and Tyler Nelson were nominated the Saturn Award for Best Editing for The Batman (2022). Hoy is a member of American Cinema Editors (ACE).

Hoy has collaborated with director Zack Snyder on the films 300 (2006), Watchmen (2009), and Sucker Punch (2011). He has also collaborated with director Matt Reeves on the films Dawn of the Planet of the Apes, War for the Planet of the Apes, and The Batman.

Hoy has a sister, Maysie Hoy, who is also a film editor.

List of editing credits
One of Hoy's first credits as editor was the film Silent Assassins (1988). Before then, his earliest credits were as assistant editor for the films Quintet (1979) and Health (1980).

Accolades

References

External links

American film editors
American Cinema Editors
Living people
Year of birth missing (living people)